Kandrše is a small settlement in the Municipality of Litija in central Slovenia. Only part of the village lies in the Municipality of Litija. The major part is in the neighbouring Municipality of Zagorje ob Savi. The area is part of the traditional region of Upper Carniola. It is now included with the rest of the municipality in the Central Sava Statistical Region; until January 2014 the municipality was part of the Central Slovenia Statistical Region.

Name
Kandrše was attested in written sources in 1350 as Kandres (and as Kandes in 1400 and Kannders in 1444). The name is of unclear origin, but is presumably based on a personal name such as Old High German Chunrad or Chuonrad 'Conrad' in the genitive form as part of a compound name: Chunrades-dorf 'Conrad's village' or Chunrades-hof 'Conrad's farm'. In the past the German name was Kandersche.

References

External links

Kandrše on Geopedia

Populated places in the Municipality of Litija